The 2020 Xfinity 500 was a NASCAR Cup Series race held on November 1, 2020 at Martinsville Speedway in Ridgeway, Virginia. Contested over 500 laps on the .526 mile (.847 km) short track, it was the 35th race of the 2020 NASCAR Cup Series season, the ninth race of the Playoffs, and final race of the Round of 8.

Report

Background

Martinsville Speedway is an International Speedway Corporation-owned NASCAR stock car racing track located in Henry County, in Ridgeway, Virginia, just to the south of Martinsville. At  in length, it is the shortest track in the NASCAR Cup Series. The track is also one of the first paved oval tracks in NASCAR, being built in 1947 by H. Clay Earles. It is also the only race track that has been on the NASCAR circuit from its beginning in 1948. Along with this, Martinsville is the only NASCAR oval track on the entire NASCAR track circuit to have asphalt surfaces on the straightaways, then concrete to cover the turns.

Entry list
 (R) denotes rookie driver.
 (i) denotes driver who are ineligible for series driver points.

Qualifying
Brad Keselowski was awarded the pole for the race as determined by competition-based formula.

Starting Lineup

Race

Stage Results

Stage One
Laps: 130

Stage Two
Laps: 130

Final Stage Results

Stage Three
Laps: 240

Race statistics
 Lead changes: 20 among 10 different drivers
 Cautions/Laps: 12 for 83
 Red flags: 0
 Time of race: 3 hours, 40 minutes and 27 seconds
 Average speed:

Post-race investigation

At the start of the race, three transfer spots were still available as only Joey Logano had clinched from his win at Kansas (he had 4,094 points).  Kevin Harvick (4,137 points) led Denny Hamlin (4,122) and Brad Keselowski (4,120) for the three positions.  Chase Elliott and Alex Bowman were tied at 4,095 points, Martin Truex, Jr. (4,084), and Kurt Busch (4,039) were the positions.  Kurt Busch had to win.  If Elliott, Bowman, Truex, or Kurt Busch won, the winning driver would move to the second position and only two positions would be available from points.  That meant Harvick's lead over fourth was 17 points.

As Truex or Elliott led for the majority of the second half, it would mean only two of the three could advance should either win.  Harvick struggled all day and had been numerous laps down because of a green flag pit stop from a cut tire, returning to the lead lap on a Lap 401 safety car caused by James Davison stalling.  On that safety car, Keselowski committed a speeding infraction.  Hamlin's car was struggling once lights were turned on as the sun was setting.  With 25 laps remaining, Keselowski was 6th, Hamlin was 11th, and Harvick was 12th.  At that time, Hamlin's teammate Erik Jones, who did not make the playoff and was leaving the team at the end of the season, was behind Hamlin.  The points were Hamlin up four, Keselowski one ahead, and Harvick one behind the cut line.  With two laps remaining, it was Keselowski (4th) and Hamlin (12th) at the cut line, with Harvick (10th) one behind and Hamlin ahead of Jones.  In order to cause a three-way tie that would eliminate Keselowski on tiebreaker (the driver whose best finish in the three race round was the worst of three would be eliminated), Harvick made a desperation pass on Kyle Busch.  The two made contact and Busch finished 9th, while Harvick finished 17th, being eliminated.

On Monday morning, less than 15 hours after the race concluded, NASCAR senior vice president of competition Scott Miller informed SiriusXM NASCAR Radio that the sanctioning body will be investigating both Harvick's deliberate crash into Kyle Busch, and team orders on the radio by Joe Gibbs Racing to ask Jones not to pass Hamlin in order to help Hamlin advance to the final.  NBC Sports posted conversations among the No. 20 Gibbs team's driver (Jones), crew chief Chris Gayle, and spotter Rick Carelli, where Gayle told Jones that Hamlin is "going to race you hard because he needs to, because it’s within like three points for those guys. He’s going to race you hard because it’s three points on those guys. Just so you’re aware.” Jones responded to Gayle, “I’ve got a huge gap behind me.” Four laps later, Carelli responded on the radio, "Don’t pass (Hamlin), Jones. Stay with him and drive what you can."

NASCAR ultimately did not issue penalties for Jones' or Harvick's team.

Media

Television
NBC Sports covered the race on the television side. Rick Allen, 1997 race winner Jeff Burton, Steve Letarte and 2014 race winner Dale Earnhardt Jr. called the action from the booth. Dave Burns, Parker Kligerman and Marty Snider handled the pit road duties.

Radio
MRN covered the radio call for the race, which was simulcast on Sirius XM NASCAR Radio. Alex Hayden and Jeff Striegle had the call for MRN when the field raced down the front straightaway. Dave Moody covered the action for MRN when the field raced down the backstraightway into turn 3. Winston Kelley and Steve Post covered the action for MRN from pit lane.

Standings after the race

Drivers' Championship standings

Manufacturers' Championship standings

Note: Only the first 16 positions are included for the driver standings.

References

Xfinity 500
Xfinity 500
NASCAR races at Martinsville Speedway
Xfinity 500